Mount Hor is a mountain in Sutton, Vermont.  It is part of the Northeastern Highlands of Vermont.
It is located on the west side of Lake Willoughby and constitutes the west side of "Willoughby Notch" ("Willoughby Gap").  There are hiking trails in Willoughby State Forest.

Mount Hor is the subject of a poem by Robert Frost. "The Mountain" appears in Frost's second book of poetry, North of Boston (1914).

See also
Mount Pisgah (Vermont)

References

Hor
Sutton, Vermont
Landforms of Caledonia County, Vermont